Jean-Marie Bienaimé Bonnassieux (1810, Panissières, Loire – 1892) was a French sculptor.

Biography
The son of a cabinet maker from Lyon, Bonnassieux showed talent as a boy and was educated at the École nationale supérieure des Beaux-Arts, Paris, under Augustin-Alexandre Dumont.  In 1836 he was the co-winner (with Auguste Ottin) of the Prix de Rome, then completed his education in Rome under the direction of Ingres.

Bonnassieux subsequently taught at the Ecole, and among his students in the 1880s was the young American Lorado Taft, and the British-American sculptor Henry Hudson Kitson. Bonnassieux is set in the context of rigid French academic training in the 19th century in a study of the careers of seventeen winners of the Prix de Rome by A. Le Normand, La Tradition Classique et l'Esprit Romantique: Les sculpteurs de l'académie de France à Rome de 1824 à 1840 (Rome, 1991).

Bonnassieux is buried at Montparnasse Cemetery.

Selected works 

 Wisdom, Truth and Error, allegorical group on top of the Pavillon de Marsan, facing the Tuileries, at the Palais du Louvre, and other work at the Louvre from the 1850s through the 1870s
 bronze figure of Henri IV, Place de Henri IV, La Flèche, 1856
 Groupe des Heures over the clock, Palais de la Bourse, Lyon, 1858 and 1863
 The iron statue of Notre-Dame de France overlooking the town of Le Puy-en-Velay is made from 213 Russian cannons taken in the Siege of Sevastopol (1854–1855) and was presented to the public on 12 September 1860 in front of 120,000 people.
 monument at the tomb of Jean Auguste Dominique Ingres, Père Lachaise Cemetery, 1868
 architectural work at the Palais de Justice, Paris, 1868
 figure of Archbishop of Paris Georges Darboy, St. Georges chapel, Notre Dame de Paris, 1872

Sources 
 Daniel Cady Eaton, A Handbook of Modern French Sculpture,
 Thierry Boyer-Bonnassieux
 Grove Dictionary of Art

External links

 

1810 births
1892 deaths
People from Loire (department)
French architectural sculptors
Chevaliers of the Légion d'honneur
Prix de Rome for sculpture
Members of the Académie des beaux-arts
Burials at Montparnasse Cemetery
19th-century French sculptors
French male sculptors
19th-century French male artists